The 1836 United States presidential election in Missouri took place between November 3 and December 7, 1836, as part of the 1836 United States presidential election. Voters chose four representatives, or electors to the Electoral College, who voted for President and Vice President.

Missouri voted for the Democratic candidate, Martin Van Buren, over Whig candidate Hugh White. Van Buren won Missouri by a margin of 19.96%.

Results

See also
 United States presidential elections in Missouri

References

Missouri
1836
1836 Missouri elections